Ganoderma tsugae, also known as hemlock varnish shelf, is a flat polypore mushroom of the genus Ganoderma.

Habitat
In contrast to Ganoderma lucidum, to which it is closely related and which it closely resembles, G. tsugae tends to grow on conifers, especially hemlocks.

Properties
Like G. lucidum, G. tsugae is purported to have medicinal properties including use for dressing a skin wound. Phylogenetic analysis has begun to better differentiate between many closely related species of Ganoderma; however, there is still disagreement as to which have the most medicinal properties. In addition, variations within the same species as well as the growth substrate and environmental conditions all the way through to preparation can have a substantial effect on the medicinal value of the product.

Edibility
Like G. lucidum, G. tsugae is non-poisonous but generally considered inedible, because of its solid woody nature; however, teas and extracts made from its fruiting bodies supposedly allow medicinal use of the compounds it contains, although this is controversial within the scientific community. A hot water extraction or tea can be very effective for extracting the polysaccharides; however, an alcohol or alcohol/glycerin extraction method is more effective for the triterpenoids.

The fresh, soft growth of the "lip" of G. tsugae can be sautéed and prepared much like other edible mushrooms. While in this nascent stage it is not woody, it can still be tough and chewy.

Medicinal use
Studies in mice have shown that G. tsugae shows several potential medicinal benefits including anti-tumor activity through some of the active polysaccharides found in G. tsugae G. tsugae has also been shown to significantly promote wound healing in mice as well as significantly increase the proliferation and migration of fibroblast cells in culture.

References

Ganodermataceae
Dietary supplements
Inedible fungi
Medicinal fungi